Historic X-Over (pronounced: Historic Crossover) was a professional wrestling event co-promoted by New Japan Pro-Wrestling (NJPW) and World Wonder Ring Stardom (Stardom). It took place on November 20, 2022, at the Ariake Arena in Tokyo, Japan.

Production

Background
On January 31, 2012, card game company Bushiroad fully acquired New Japan Pro-Wrestling (NJPW) from video game developer Yuke's. On October 17, 2019, Bushiroad announced in a press conference that they had also acquired World Wonder Ring Stardom (Stardom) from the company's President Rossy Ogawa, making Stardom the sister promotion of NJPW. Since Wrestle Kingdom 14, NJPW has featured Stardom matches at various NJPW events. On June 6, 2022, during Bushiroad's 15th anniversary press conference, it was announced that NJPW and Stardom will hold its first shared event on November 20. NJPW President Takami Ohbari, revealed that the event would include at least two mixed tag team matches and that Stardom wrestlers would be featured on NJPW Strong events in the United States. On July 29, NJPW and Stardom announced the creation of the IWGP Women's Championship, which would be defended at NJPW events in Japan and United States by Stardom wrestlers. The inaugural champion will be crowned at Historic X-Over.

Storylines
Historic X-Over featured eleven professional wrestling matches that result from scripted storylines, where wrestlers portray villains, heroes, or less distinguishable characters in the scripted events that build tension and culminate in a wrestling match or series of matches.

On August 27, 2022, representatives from fives stables would draw straws to determine which four stables out of the five would compete for in the IWGP Women's Championship tournament. The representatives were Giulia from Donna Del Mondo, Mayu Iwatani from Stars, Starlight Kid from Oedo Tai, and Utami Hayashishita from Queen's Quest with Syuri from God's Eye being eliminated due to drawing the shortest straw. With Iwatani, Hayashishita, Himeka from Donna Del Mondo and Momo Watanabe from Oedo Tai being chosen to complete in the on the Japanese side of the tournament, while Jazzy Gabert, Ava White, and Kairi (despite being Japanese) was announced to compete on the foreigner side with Kairi receiving a first round bye. On October 2 at Royal Quest II, Gabert defeated White to advanced to the semi-final while Iwatani defeated Watanabe and Hayashishita defeated Himeka on October 22 to advance. On October 23, Iwatani and Kairi would defeat Hayashishita and Gabert to advance to the finals at Historic X-Over.

On October 26, during a NJPW World Television Championship tournament match between Toru Yano and Great-O-Khan was the return of The Great Muta return to NJPW, where he cost Great-O-Khan's match by spraying green mist in his face. During backstage comments, Muta expressed his desire to tag with Yano and Kazuchika Okada at Historic X-Over to take on Great-O-Khan and the United Empire with the match being made official shortly after.

On November 5 at Battle Autumn, Will Ospreay successfully defended the IWGP United States Heavyweight Championship against Tetsuya Naito in the main event. After the match, Ospreay would lay down a open challenge for the title for Historic X-Over only to have the returning Shota Umino attack Ospreay and his fellow United Empire stable in the ring, accepting Ospreay's open challenge and setting up the title match.

Results

IWGP Women's Championship tournament

Stardom Rambo entrances and eliminations

See also

2022 in professional wrestling
List of major NJPW events
List of major World Wonder Ring Stardom events

References

External links

2022 in Tokyo
2022 in professional wrestling
Events in Tokyo
New Japan Pro-Wrestling shows
Professional wrestling in Tokyo
Professional wrestling joint events
World Wonder Ring Stardom shows